Group 4 of the UEFA Women's Euro 2017 qualifying competition consisted of five teams: Sweden, Denmark, Poland, Slovakia, and Moldova. The composition of the eight groups in the qualifying group stage was decided by the draw held on 20 April 2015.

The group was played in home-and-away round-robin format. The group winners qualified directly for the final tournament, while the runners-up also qualified directly if they were one of the six best runners-up among all eight groups (not counting results against the fifth-placed team); otherwise, the runners-up advance to the play-offs.

Standings

Matches
Times are CEST (UTC+2) for dates between 29 March and 24 October 2015 and between 27 March and 29 October 2016, for other dates times are CET (UTC+1).

Goalscorers
7 goals

 Pernille Harder
 Nadia Nadim

6 goals

 Sanne Troelsgaard Nielsen

3 goals

 Katarzyna Daleszczyk
 Dana Fecková
 Kosovare Asllani
 Fridolina Rolfö

2 goals

 Johanna Rasmussen
 Dominika Grabowska
 Ewa Pajor
 Alexandra Bíróová
 Jana Vojteková
 Emilia Appelqvist
 Pauline Hammarlund
 Lotta Schelin
 Olivia Schough

1 goal

 Ludmila Andone
 Natalia Chudzik
 Agnieszka Winczo
 Patrícia Fischerová
 Patrícia Hmírová
 Lucia Ondrušová
 Dominika Škorvánková
 Emma Berglund
 Stina Blackstenius
 Malin Diaz
 Lina Hurtig
 Amanda Ilestedt
 Caroline Seger
 Linda Sembrant

1 own goal

 Ana Arnautu (playing against Poland)
 Natalia Munteanu (playing against Sweden)

References

External links
Standings, UEFA.com

Group 4